Political Geography is a peer-reviewed academic journal published by Elsevier covering the geographical and spatial dimensions of politics and the political. The current editor-in-chief is Kevin Grove (Florida International University).

According to the Journal Citation Reports, the journal has a 2019 impact factor of 3.043, ranking it 23rd out of 180 journals in the category "Political Science" and 18th out of 84 journals in the category "Geography".

History 
The journal began as Political Geography Quarterly in 1982. It became a bimonthly magazine in 1992.

See also 
 List of political science journals

References

External links 
 

Bimonthly journals
Elsevier academic journals
English-language journals
Geography journals
Political science journals
Publications established in 1982